Düztahiroba (also, Dustair, Dustairoba, and Dyuztairoba) is a village in the Khachmaz Rayon of Azerbaijan.  The village forms part of the municipality of Yalama.

References 

Populated places in Khachmaz District